Giedrė Rakauskaitė  (born 13 June 1991 in Kaunas) is a British Paralympic rower who is a triple World champion in the mixed coxed four.

She won a gold medal in the mixed cox four at the 2020 Tokyo Paralympics.

Rakauskaitė was appointed Member of the Order of the British Empire (MBE) in the 2022 New Year Honours for services to rowing.

References

External links

1991 births
Living people
Lithuanian emigrants to the United Kingdom
British female rowers
Paralympic rowers of Great Britain
Rowers at the 2020 Summer Paralympics
Medalists at the 2020 Summer Paralympics
Paralympic medalists in rowing
Paralympic gold medalists for Great Britain
Members of the Order of the British Empire
Naturalised citizens of the United Kingdom
People from Kaunas